The Beeston Brewery Company (also known as the Beeston Brewery and Malting Company) was a brewery based in Beeston, Nottinghamshire, England that opened in 1880 and closed in 1922.

History

The Beeston Brewery Company was formed in the late 1870s and a brewery was built in 1880 alongside the Midland Railway line between Nottingham and Derby. The company had its own railway sidings running off the mainline.

The company had both malting and brewery functions on the same site. The architects were Wilson and Company and the builders were Waite, Corbould and Faulkner. It was the first brewery in England to have pneumatic maltings.

In 1881 the manager was Alexander Anderson and who was replaced by Samuel Theodore Bunning in 1883. An extension to the brewery was made in 1884 and a new barley store was added in 1898. In 1889 a fire destroyed part of the complex including the pneumatic maltings, but the brewery part of the complex was saved by the local fire brigade.

Bunning continued to manage the company until it was taken over by James Shipstone and Sons Limited in 1922. Brewing ceased and in 1924 Shipstones converted the buildings to a maltings. The last maltings were done in 2000, after which the buildings were mothballed.

The remaining buildings survived until 2012 when demolition started. The site was cleared early in 2013.

References

Defunct breweries of the United Kingdom
British companies established in 1880
Food and drink companies established in 1880
Food and drink companies disestablished in 1922
1880 establishments in England
Manufacturing companies based in Nottingham
Beeston, Nottinghamshire
1922 disestablishments in England
British companies disestablished in 1922